Flower Drum Song is a 1961 American musical film directed by Henry Koster, adapted from the 1958 Broadway musical Flower Drum Song, written by the composer Richard Rodgers and the lyricist/librettist Oscar Hammerstein II, in turn based on the 1957 novel of the same name by the Chinese American author Chin Yang Lee. The film stars Nancy Kwan, James Shigeta, Miyoshi Umeki, Jack Soo, Benson Fong and Juanita Hall. It was nominated for five Academy Awards and two Golden Globe Awards, including Best Motion Picture – Musical or Comedy.

Flower Drum Song became the first major Hollywood feature film to have a majority Asian-American cast in a contemporary Asian-American story. It would be the last film to do so for more than 30 years, until The Joy Luck Club (1993). In 2008, Flower Drum Song was selected for preservation in the United States National Film Registry by the Library of Congress as being "culturally, historically, or aesthetically significant".

Plot

A young woman named Mei Li emigrates from China to Chinatown, San Francisco as an illegal immigrant with her father. After landing, the Lis seek the address of Madam Fong, the mother of Sammy Fong, to whom Mei Li has been promised in an arranged marriage. While asking where to find Madam Fong, Mei Li performs a flower drum song to earn money ("A Hundred Million Miracles"). Sammy is the owner of a night club, the Celestial Gardens (inspired by the actual Forbidden City nightclub) and already is romantically involved with his leading showgirl Linda Low. The Lis arrive at the Celestial Gardens during a show ("Fan Tan Fannie").

Sammy does his best to dissuade Mei Li from marrying him, introducing her to Madame Liang, the sister-in-law of Master Wang. Liang and Wang bemoan the gap between immigrants and their offspring ("The Other Generation") as Master Wang's younger son Wang San gives his own take on the gap to some younger children. Dissolving the marriage contract is harder than either imagined. Master Wang is persuaded by Madame Liang to allow Mei Li to fall in love naturally with Master Wang's eldest son Wang Ta, and the Lis move in with Master Wang. However, Wang Ta is dazzled by the charms of Linda, who flirts with him ("I Enjoy Being a Girl"). He asks her to go on a date, and she convinces him to give her his fraternity pin to symbolize they are "going steady" during the date.

When Mei Li sees Wang Ta sneaking back in after the date, she mistakes his friendly greeting as a welcome to the household and starts to warm to America ("I Am Going to Like It Here"). Linda plans to use Wang Ta to force a commitment from Sammy Fong out of jealousy, but Sammy gets wind of her scheme when Linda attends a party to celebrate both Wang Ta's graduation from university and Madame Liang's graduation from citizenship classes. Madame Liang compares the citizens of the U.S. to a mix of different ingredients ("Chop Suey"). At the party, Linda has Frankie Wing, the club emcee, pose as her brother to grant permission for Linda to marry Wang Ta. Mei Li, hearing this, becomes discouraged, and Ta and his father argue over his marriage plans. Ta argues that he is old enough to make his own decisions, but the father says that he will be the one to let Ta know when he is old enough.

At the New Year's Parade, Linda rides on a float and sings about Grant Avenue, Chinatown's "western street with eastern manners" ("Grant Avenue"). Sammy, in an effort to keep Linda from marrying Wang Ta, invites Wang Ta and his family to Celestial Gardens, where they see Frankie Wing recall girls he has known ("Gliding Through My Memoree") and Linda's nightclub act ("Fan Tan Fannie"). Wang Ta is shocked at her performance. He leaves, distraught, accompanied by the seamstress Helen Chao, his friend since childhood. Helen also grew up in the U.S. and deeply loves Wang Ta. Ta becomes drunk in his misery over Linda, and Helen ends up letting him stay for the night in her apartment, where she declares her unrequited love ("Love, Look Away").

In the morning, Mei Li comes to deliver a burned coat for Helen to mend and becomes distressed when she discovers Wang Ta's clothing in Helen's kitchen. When Wang Ta wakes up (seconds after Mei Li leaves), he still does not notice Helen's affections, even as she pleads for him to stay, and he leaves quickly. He goes to speak with Mei Li, now realizing that she is a better match for him than Linda Low ("You Are Beautiful"), only to have Mei Li reject him, saying that she once loved him, but not anymore.

She and her father leave Master Wang's house and pursue the marriage contract between Mei Li and Sammy Fong. Sammy has proposed to Linda, who daydreams about wedded life ("Sunday"). Unfortunately, now that Mei Li is pursuing Sammy again, he and Linda will be unable to marry as the contract with Mei Li is binding. Sammy enumerates his many faults ("Don't Marry Me") in a last-ditch attempt to convince Mei Li to break the contract. Before the wedding, Wang Ta goes to see Mei Li, and they both realize that they are deeply in love with one another. They agree to try to come up with a way to get Mei Li out of her marriage contract.

The day of the wedding, before she is to sip from a goblet (which would seal her marriage to Sammy), Mei Li declares that, because she entered the United States illegally, the marriage contract is null and void (which she learned from a TV Western she watched on the late show the previous night). Wang Ta can marry Mei Li, and Sammy decides to marry Linda, resulting in a double wedding.

Cast

Music
Although the score of Flower Drum Song did not produce many hit tunes, "I Enjoy Being a Girl" has been recorded by such performers as Doris Day, Peggy Lee, Pat Suzuki, and Phranc, and it has been used in other movies and shows, and "Love, Look Away" was recorded by Tony Bennett.

Compared with the Broadway musical on which it is based, the film rearranged the order of the songs. According to David Henry Hwang, the song "Like a God" was dropped from the film because studio executives were worried it could "offend audiences in the American South". Alfred Newman, the film's music supervisor and score conductor, wrote a letter to producer Ross Hunter protesting the excision of music arrangers from the credits during post-production; Hunter agreed to reinsert a credit for Ken Darby, the associate music supervisor.

Soundtrack

The 1961 soundtrack album from the film was critically praised; Variety lauded Newman's "rousing orchestration". Shortly after its release by Decca Records, both the monaural and stereo versions of the soundtrack charted on the list of bestselling records, according to Billboards Top LP's list. For the film soundtrack album, the performers were credited by role, not name, since "several of the performers in the movie don't do their own singing." The singing voice of the character Linda Low (portrayed by Nancy Kwan) was dubbed by B.J. Baker, a white studio singer who had worked with Elvis Presley, Frank Sinatra, Bobby Darin, The Righteous Brothers, and Sam Cooke.

The torch song "Love, Look Away" sung by Helen Chao (portrayed by Reiko Sato) was dubbed in by the American opera singer Marilyn Horne, who was offered the job by Alfred Newman after Horne's triumphant début with the San Francisco Opera in Wozzeck. Horne and Newman were friends through her extensive background singing on film soundtracks. In addition, Dr. Han Li (portrayed by Kam Tong) is dubbed by John Dodson.

The film soundtrack was reissued on CD by Decca Broadway on September 24, 2002, which added a bonus track of "Love, Look Away" (2:27), recorded by Rosemary Clooney around 1958.

Production
After the novel was released and became a bestseller, options were offered to author C.Y. Lee to produce a movie or stage adaptation. Lee was torn between the movie offer, which was more lucrative at $50,000, but would force him to give up all rights, or the stage offer from Joseph Fields, which only gave him $3,000 but only relinquished stage rights. After getting drunk the night of the decision, Lee could not remember the offer he chose, but his agent congratulated him on making the right choice the next morning. It turns out Lee had chosen the offer from Fields, who initially wanted to produce a play and eventually a movie, but after Fields mentioned the novel to Rodgers and Hammerstein, they signed on to write the musical.

The 1961 film production of Flower Drum Song was produced by Universal Studios, a break for Rodgers and Hammerstein, who had previously had their films produced by Twentieth Century Fox. The screenplay was written by Joseph Fields, who had previously collaborated with Hammerstein on the libretto for the musical, but had not previously written a major musical film; likewise, the director Henry Koster and producer Ross Hunter were working on their first musical film.

San Francisco watercolorist Dong Kingman painted the opening title sequence, which traces the journey of Mei Li from Hong Kong. Hermes Pan provided the choreography.

Principal photography began on March 20, 1961; the film was largely shot at Stage 12 of the Universal Studios Lot, on a  set built to reproduce Chinatown, including the opening scenes at Saint Mary's Square (complete with a replica of the stainless steel statute of Sun Yat-Sen sculpted by Beniamino Bufano), at a cost of $310,000.

Casting
The film was the first to feature a cast almost entirely consisting of Asian Americans (one of the few speaking white parts being that of a mugger), including dancers, though three of the singers used for dubbing were not Asian. At the time, the practice of yellowface was more common than Asian actors playing Asian roles (see Examples of yellowface).

Starring in the movie were Nancy Kwan, James Shigeta, Benson Fong, James Hong, Reiko Sato, Victor Sen Yung, and the original Broadway cast members Jack Soo, Miyoshi Umeki, and Juanita Hall (an African American actress who had previously played Pacific Islander Bloody Mary in the Broadway and film productions of Rodgers and Hammerstein's South Pacific).

For an episode of the contemporary TV show Wagon Train, white actor Arnold Stang was cast in yellowface wearing rubber eyelids. For this casting decision, the reason given was that "all of Hollywood's Oriental actors were busy making Flower Drum Song".

Anna May Wong had been scheduled to play the part of Madam Liang, but she died in February 1961, before production began. Kwan was cast in the role of Linda Low when she met Ross Hunter, the producer of Flower Drum Song, at a party after he saw her film debut in the 1960 film adaptation of The World of Suzie Wong. Kwan's hiring was announced in February 1961.

Changes from musical and novel

Among changes for the film, the song "Like a God" was changed from a song into a presentation of beat poetry. The film (and earlier stage version) is lighter-hearted than the novel upon which it is based. For example, while Helen is simply left alone and broken-hearted in the musical and film versions, Ta's rejection of her prompts her to commit suicide in the novel. In the novel, Mei Li does not arrive in Chinatown illegally, nor does she have an arranged marriage with Sammy Fong (the character was created for the musical and film).

Filming locations
Although set in San Francisco, only a few scenes were actually filmed on location, including a scene with Kwan and Shigeta on Twin Peaks. However, neither Kwan nor Shigeta actually filmed at this location. Doubles stood in for them for the long shots of the car arriving and leaving Twin Peaks. The close-ups of Kwan and Shigeta in the car were process shots filmed at Universal Studios in Hollywood with the view from Twin Peaks projected on a screen behind them.

The film includes scenes from the 1961 San Francisco Chinese New Year Festival and Parade.

Awards and honors

The film is recognized by American Film Institute in these lists:
 2002: AFI's 100 Years...100 Passions – Nominated
 2004: AFI's 100 Years...100 Songs:
 "I Enjoy Being a Girl" – Nominated

Release

Flower Drum Song premiered in New York City at Radio City Music Hall on November 9, 1961. The initial plan was to have the premiere on November 17 in San Francisco, at the Golden Gate Theatre, to benefit local hospitals, including the San Francisco Chinese Hospital. The Golden Gate Theatre premiere would be followed by a three-day Flower Drum Festival in Chinatown. A private screening was held for President John F. Kennedy and his family at the Kennedy Compound in Hyannis Port on November 24. The film was widely released near Christmas.

It has been asserted the film was the only Hollywood adaptation of a Rodgers and Hammerstein musical to lose money. The production rights were reported as costing $1 million and the budget was $4 million, while gross revenues have been reported as $10.7 million. Since half of gross revenues are actually returned as "rentals" to the studio, and since movies at the time needed to make back at least twice their production and advertising budgets to be profitable, the movie's $5 million rental return was a loss for the studio.

Reception
Reviewing for The New York Times after the premiere, Bosley Crowther called the film neither "subtle or fragile ... It is gaudy and gaggy and quite melodic." Life called it "gay, tuneful and well worth the admission". However, Variety thought that "much of the fundamental charm, grace and novelty of Rodgers & Hammerstein's Flower Drum Song has been overwhelmed by the sheer opulence and glamour [of the film]".

David H. Lewis in 2006 called it "a bizarre pastiche of limping mediocracy". He comments that since the 1958 version of the musical was only rarely revived for decades after its initial run, the film "would in future years come to stand for the stage musical it so crassly misrepresented" and would serve as the version that academics and latter-day theatre critics would judge when they analyzed the musical. James Deaville countered that Koster and Hunter "wanted to make the musical more relevant and accessible ... [by] intensify[ing] the generational conflict ... [and] required spelling out much that the musical left to the audience's imagination."

Some Asian-Americans have found the film offensive in later years due to common stereotypes and what was seen as miscasting Japanese American actors Shigeta and Umeki in Chinese American roles. David Henry Hwang, who revised the musical for a 2001 revival, "had a secret soft spot for the movie version. 'It was kind of a guilty pleasure ... and one of the only big Hollywood films where you could see a lot of really good Asian actors onscreen, singing and dancing and cracking jokes.'" Writer Joanna Lee praised the film's portrayal of Asian Americans as "prominent and legitimate American citizens".

Home media
The film was first issued on VHS in 1986, then reissued in 1991 followed by a LaserDisc version in 1992 by MCA Home Video. The LaserDisc and VHS versions of the film were cropped to a 1.33:1 ratio using pan and scan with the exception of the "I Enjoy Being a Girl" sequence. After the VHS and LaserDisc versions went out of print, the film was unavailable on home media for many years, while most of the other video versions of Rodgers and Hammerstein movies were released on DVD by other studios.

Universal Studios Home Entertainment (in association with the estates of Rodgers and Hammerstein) finally released a DVD version on November 7, 2006, with extra features on the making and casting of the movie. It includes interviews with David Henry Hwang, Pat Suzuki, and Nancy Kwan, and pictures from the 1958 and 2002 Broadway rehearsals and practice sessions, as well as pictures of Rodgers, Hammerstein, and Fields. On May 24, 2022 the film was released on high definition Blu Ray disc.

See also

 List of American films of 1961

References

Bibliography

External links
 
 
 
 
 Flower Drum Songs at Google Books
 
 R&H Theatricals
 Nancy-Kwan.com filmography with notes on the actors in Flower Drum Song
 
 
 
 
 
 Flower Drum Song essay by Daniel Eagan in America's Film Legacy: The Authoritative Guide to the Landmark Movies in the National Film Registry, A&C Black, 2010 , pages 575–576

1961 films
1961 romantic comedy films
1961 musical comedy films
American romantic comedy films
American romantic musical films
Asian-American musical films
Films about Chinese Americans
1960s English-language films
Cantonese-language films
Chinatown, San Francisco in fiction
Films based on adaptations
Films based on musicals
Films directed by Henry Koster
Films produced by Ross Hunter
Films scored by Alfred Newman
Films scored by Ken Darby
Films set in San Francisco
Films set in the San Francisco Bay Area
Films shot in San Francisco
Films about race and ethnicity
United States National Film Registry films
Universal Pictures films
1960s American films